Alfred "Chips" Ezra, OBE (1872 – 1 August 1955) was a British breeder and keeper of birds. He built up a collection of rare birds at Foxwarren Park in southern England that was considered the finest of its kind.

Biography

Alfred Ezra was born in India in 1872 to a Jewish family and was privately educated in Calcutta.  His father was Elias David Ezra and his mother was Mozelle Sassoon. His brother David maintained a private zoo in Calcutta.

He moved to England in 1912. During World War I he served with Indian troops in Europe, and was named an Officer of the Order of the British Empire for his efforts.

Ezra acquired Foxwarren Park in Surrey in 1919. There he assembled a private collection of rare birds which was considered the finest of its kind before the World War II, when the estate was commandeered for war work. He was President of the Avicultural Society and a prominent member of the Zoological Society of London, which awarded him a gold medal. He also wrote articles for Avicultural Magazine and other journals.

Collection
Ezra started collecting birds while a child in India.  On his journey to England, he travelled through the Pamir Mountains and Turkestan, collecting rare birds and animals on this expedition.  From 1920 to 1940, his collection at Foxwarren Park was probably the finest private zoo in the world.

He kept hummingbirds and sunbirds. Their specialised diet of nectar was difficult to reproduce in captivity, and Ezra established the importance of including fat, minerals, protein, and vitamins in their diet.  A mixture which he used with success added condensed milk and Mellin's Food—typically food for human babies—to honey, which was then watered down.  In this way, he was able to keep a garnet-throated hummingbird for eight years—a remarkable record when these had once been thought impossible to keep in captivity.

Ezra also kept parakeets.  In 1933, a pair of fledgling Indian ring-necked parakeets were smothered in their nest by a swarm of bees.  He had a pair of pink-headed ducks which were the last of their kind, now being thought extinct.

Personal life
Ezra married Muriel Sassoon, with whom he had two daughters, Aline and Ruth. He died at Foxwarren Park on 1 August 1955, age 82, after a lengthy illness.

References

Aviculture
1872 births
1955 deaths
Alfred
Sassoon family
British India emigrants to the United Kingdom
British people of Indian-Jewish descent
Baghdadi Jews